The South Shore Kings are a Tier III Junior A ice hockey team playing in the United States Premier Hockey League (USPHL). The team plays at the Foxboro Sports Center located in Foxboro, Massachusetts.

The organization fields Tier III teams in the USPHL Premier and Elite Divisions. The Kings also offer youth hockey select teams at the Bantam, Peewee, and Squirt and other various levels.

History
The franchise, then known as the NECDL Classics, is a charter member of the Eastern Junior Hockey League (EJHL) since 1993. In 1997 the Classics became the Walpole Stars, remaining as such until 2006, when it changed its name to the Foxboro Stars. One year later the team aligned itself with the South Shore Kings organization (which had fielded midget team), becoming known as the South Shore Kings.

The USPHL was formed for the 2013–14 season during a Tier III reorganization that led to the dissolution of the EJHL. Prior to that season, the Kings participated in the former Junior A Eastern Junior Hockey League (EJHL), the former Junior B Empire Junior Hockey League (EmJHL) and Continental Hockey Association (later named Eastern States Hockey League or ESHL). The former EJHL team now plays in the USPHL Premier Divisions, the former ESHL team plays in the Elite Division, and the former EmJHL team played in the Empire Division from 2012 to 2015.

Season-by-season records

USA Hockey Tier III Junior A National Championships
Round robin play in pool with top 4 teams advancing to semi-final.

Alumni
Noel Acciari – Florida Panthers (NHL)
Charlie Coyle – Drafted in 2010 by San Jose Sharks (NHL), traded to and debuted with the Minnesota Wild in 2012. Subsequently traded to Boston becoming a dependable top 9 forward for the Bruins. 
Jim Fahey – San Jose Sharks (NHL) and New Jersey Devils (NHL), 2003 First Team All-American with Northeastern University
Matt Gilroy – New York Rangers (NHL), 2009 Hobey Baker Award Winner, 2008 and 2009 First Team All-American, 2007 Second Team All-American with Boston University
Gianni Paolo – Actor most known for portraying Brayden Weston on the hit crime drama Power, and Power Book II: Ghost; Also known for MA, The Fosters, The Mick and Chance (TV series)
Jordan Smotherman – Atlanta Thrashers (NHL)
Chris Wagner – Boston Bruins (NHL)

References

External links
 South Shore Kings Juniors

Ice hockey teams in Massachusetts
Sports in Foxborough, Massachusetts
Ice hockey clubs established in 1993
Junior ice hockey teams in the United States
1993 establishments in Massachusetts